Konan may refer to:
 Conan (disambiguation), a name spelt "Konan" in the Breton language
 Kɔnan, a male given name in a number of Akan cultures, chiefly the Baoulé people, for whom it is typically given to any male born on a Wednesday (mlan), and corresponds to the female given name Amlan (usually transcribed as « Aménan » in French). It corresponds to various given names in other Akan cultural groups : Kobénan, Kablan, Kwabená, etc. (see Akan names).

People
 Konan Naito (1866–1934), Japanese historian and sinologist
 Konan Serge Kouadio (born 1988), Ivorian footballer playing for Fredrikstad F.K.
 Axel Cédric Konan (born 1983), Ivorian footballer who last played for Swiss Super League team A.C.Bellinzona
 Denise Konan, Interim Chancellor of the University of Hawaiʻi at Mānoa
 Didier Konan Ya (born 1984), footballer who plays for Fortuna Düsseldorf in Germany and the Côte d'Ivoire national team
 Charles Konan Banny (born 1940), Prime Minister in the Ivory Coast in 2006–2007
 Henri Konan Bédié (born 1935), President of the Ivory Coast from 1993 to 1999
 Karl "Konan" Wilson (born 1990), of south London rap duo Krept and Konan
 Oussou Konan Anicet (1989-2022), Ivorian Footballer

Fiction 
 Konan (Naruto), a character in the Naruto universe

Places
 Kōnan, Aichi (江南市), a city in Aichi Prefecture
 Kōnan, Kōchi (香南市), a city in Kochi Prefecture
 Konan, Shiga (湖南市), a city in Shiga Prefecture
 Kōnan, Saitama (江南町), a former town in Saitama Prefecture
 Kōnan, Kagawa (香南町), a former town in Kagawa Prefecture
 Kōnan, Shiga (甲南町), a former town in Shiga Prefecture
 Kōnan, Tokyo (港南) in Minato, Tokyo
 Konan University, a university located in the city of Kobe, Japan
 Kōnan-ku, Yokohama (港南区) in Yokohama

 Hungnam (興南市), a former city in North Hamgyong Province, North Korea, named Konan during the Japanese occupation of Korea 1910–1945

Businesses
 Kōnan Railway Company, a railway operator in Aomori Prefecture, Japan
 Kōnan Bus Company, a bus company headquartered in Hirosaki, Aomori, Japan

See also
 Konnan (born 1964)